The 2013–14 Hellenic Football League season was the 61st in the history of the Hellenic Football League, a football competition in England.

Premier Division

Premier Division featured 16 clubs which competed in the division last season, along with four new clubs:
Abingdon United, resigned from the Southern Football League
Bracknell Town, promoted from Division One East
Brimscombe & Thrupp, promoted from Division One West
Wootton Bassett Town, promoted from Division One West

League table

Results

Division One East

Division One East featured twelve clubs which competed in the division last season, along with two new clubs:
Burnham reserves, promoted from Division Two East
Wokingham & Emmbrook, demoted from the Premier Division

League table

Results

Division One West

Division One West featured twelve clubs which competed in the division last season, along with three new clubs:
Easington Sports, transferred from Division One East
Shortwood United reserves, promoted from Division Two West
Tuffley Rovers, promoted from the Gloucestershire County League

Also, North Leigh reserves were renamed North Leigh United.

League table

Results

Division Two East

Division Two East featured nine clubs which competed in the division last season, along with three new clubs:
Chalfont Wasps reserves
Henley Town reserves
Wokingham & Emmbrook reserves, joined from the Reading League

League table

Results

Division Two West

Division Two West featured ten clubs which competed in the division last season, along with two new clubs:
Beversbrook
Oxford City Nomads development

League table

Results

References

External links
 Official Site

2013-14
9